Childhood tumor syndrome is a condition characterized by axillary freckling, neurofibromas and/or CNS gliomas.

See also 
 Apert syndrome
 List of cutaneous conditions

References 

Genodermatoses
Syndromes